The Southern Railway (SR) gave the designation CP to the fleet of AC electric multiple units used on the former London, Brighton and South Coast Railway lines in the Crystal Palace area.

Construction
The CP (Crystal Palace stock) units were built in 1911–1913 to provide the electric train stock required for the LBSCR AC overhead electrification to Crystal Palace and the surrounding area. This stock comprised some 90 cars, which were used in three-car formations, usually (Driving Trailer Composite+Driving Motor Brake Third+Driving Trailer Composite).

Thirty motor coaches and 30 driving trailers were built by the Metropolitan Amalgamated Carriage and Wagon Co. Ltd. in 1911. Each motor coach had four  Winter Eichberg motors. A further 26 driving trailers were built at the LBSC's Lancing Carriage Works.  In 1912, four additional motor and trailer pairs were delivered by MAC&W's successor, the Metropolitan Carriage, Wagon and Finance Company. Lancing Works built eight more trailers the following year. 

After the replacement of the AC overhead equipment by the 660 V DC third rail system adopted as standard by the SR, the carriages that formed these units were rebuilt accordingly.

Formations
The LB&SCR originally did not buy sufficient stock for 30 sets, on the grounds that the trailers cars would be quicker to overhaul than the motor cars. Fixed formations were not used, and as the Motor cars had cabs, the CP stock could be used in trains of two to six vehicles.

References

SR CP
CP
London, Brighton and South Coast Railway
Train-related introductions in 1911